The  Merrill P. Barber Bridge  is a concrete arch bridge that spans the Indian River Intracoastal Waterway in Indian River County, Florida.  The bridge was built by Odebrecht Contractors of Florida, Inc. and was completed in 1995.  A fishing pier is constructed below the bridge on the east side.

The bridge is named for Merrill P. Barber, the mayor of Vero Beach from 1947 to 1949, and member of the Florida Senate from the 12th District from 1954 to 1958 and from the 29th District from 1963 to 1968.

The vertical clearance is 65 ft.

The Florida Department of Transportation number is 880087.

The bridge replaced the old Barber Bridge, built in 1951, which was concrete and had a steel bascule span. This bridge was in constant state of disrepair and was removed, barged out to sea and sunk to become a reef. The steel bascule span was purchased by Disney and is in Orlando at the Walt Disney World theme park.

References 
 Barber Bridge, 17 February 1995, Press Journal Sunday Edition
 
 Indian river county historical timeline 
 Indian River County, By Indian River Genealogical Society, Indian River Genealogical Society Published 2007 Arcadia Publishing
 Cruisers Net
 Structures Design Office - Aesthetic Lighting of Florida Bridges
 Press Journal Sunday, Barber Bridge, 17 February 1995

Bridges completed in 1995
Transportation buildings and structures in Indian River County, Florida
Road bridges in Florida
Buildings and structures in Vero Beach, Florida
Concrete bridges in Florida
Arch bridges in the United States
Indian River Lagoon
Bridges over the Indian River (Florida)
1995 establishments in Florida
Trestle bridges in the United States
Transportation in Vero Beach, Florida